William Henry Mountjoy (a.k.a. Medicine Bill) (December 11, 1858 – May 19, 1894) was a Canadian-born pitcher in Major League Baseball.

References

External links

1858 births
1894 deaths
19th-century baseball players
Baltimore Orioles (AA) players
Baseball people from Ontario
Binghamton Bingoes players
Canadian expatriate baseball players in the United States
Cincinnati Red Stockings (AA) players
Denver Mountain Lions players
Denver Mountaineers players
Major League Baseball pitchers
Nashville Blues players
Birmingham Ironmakers players
Major League Baseball players from Canada